Atopophysa opulens is a moth of the family Geometridae first described by Louis Beethoven Prout in 1914. It is found in Taiwan.

The wingspan is 25–32 mm.

References

Moths described in 1914
Larentiinae
Moths of Taiwan